Metropolitan Parkway or Metro Parkway is a major thoroughfare in Metro Detroit that stretches west from Lake St. Clair Metropark to Bloomfield Township. Metro Parkway corresponds to 16 Mile Road in Metro Detroit's mile road system, and is sometimes referred to as such by area residents, but it is rarely officially called 16 Mile. It is only called Metro Parkway in Macomb County, and is known as Big Beaver Road and Quarton Road in Oakland County.

Route description 
At its start, Metro Parkway is a four-lane divided expressway with signalized intersections at major roads, but very limited access from side streets. The east end of Metro Parkway is in Harrison Township at the main entrance to Lake St. Clair Metropark, at an intersection with Jefferson Avenue. Two miles to the west, Metro Parkway meets Interstate 94 at a partial cloverleaf interchange, and then crosses the Clinton River and enters Clinton Township. There, Metro Parkway widens to six lanes, and is joined by a frontage road, Nunneley Road, on either side, before an intersection with Gratiot Avenue. It crosses the Clinton River again as it enters Sterling Heights.

After crossing the river, Metro Parkway passes the Freedom Hill County Park. It becomes a more standard divided highway at the Schoenherr Road intersection, with business and side streets along the corridor. After it crosses Van Dyke Avenue, Metro Parkway passes Chrysler's Sterling Heights Assembly plant, before a short overpass carries the road over a railroad track. A frontage road runs at-grade alongside the overpass, providing access to the Chrysler plant and other businesses between Van Dyke and Mound Road. The road then passes the Detroit Free Press/Detroit News printing plant, and continues west as Metro Parkway for another two miles.

Upon crossing Dequindre Road, the Macomb-Oakland County border, Metro Parkway enters Troy and its name changes to Big Beaver Road. Big Beaver initially runs through a residential area, but the corridor progressively becomes more commercialized as it approaches I-75, with strip malls on either side at the Rochester Road intersection. High-rise office buildings, including the PNC Center, dominate the landscape by the time Big Beaver crosses Livernois Road. The three-mile segment of Big Beaver between Rochester Road and Coolidge Highway forms Troy's central business district, and is one of the busiest corridors in Oakland County.

Half a mile west of Livernois, Big Beaver meets Interstate 75. The junction with I-75 was previously a cloverleaf interchange, but it was reconstructed in 2020 as a diverging diamond interchange. Big Beaver then continues west past more hotels and office buildings, including the headquarters of Kelly Services. The two buildings of the high-end Somerset Collection shopping mall, connected by an enclosed pedestrian bridge, flank Big Beaver on either side as it approaches Coolidge Highway.

West of Coolidge, Big Beaver passes the long-abandoned former Kmart headquarters and a few more office buildings before narrowing to a five-lane undivided road. As it crosses Adams Road, Big Beaver enters Bloomfield Township, and crosses Woodward Avenue a mile to the west. Immediately west of the Woodward intersection, the road narrows to two lanes, and its name changes again to Quarton Road. Quarton continues west for another three miles along the southern border of Bloomfield Hills, before ending at US-24 (Telegraph Road).

Quarton continues as a local road at another intersection a quarter mile north on Telegraph. This segment of Quarton runs two miles west before ending at Inkster Road. West of Inkster, Quarton's path is followed by Walnut Lake Road in West Bloomfield, and eventually by Buno Road in Milford Township.

Big Beaver Corridor Study
In 2006, the Big Beaver Corridor Study was announced, with the goal of making Big Beaver into a world-class boulevard, creating a downtown for Troy, which while having office parks conspicuously lacks a city center.

The Big Beaver Corridor Study catalogues, analyzes, and defines issues that will begin a process of planning and directing development opportunities for years to come.  Specifically, this document, in part one, provides an overview analysis of existing conditions and summarizes stakeholder and expert opinions as important input for part two efforts to redefine basic and overall corridor characteristics and experience.

Part two addresses the corridor as "world class boulevard" concept, advocated by the DDA as the strategy to re-ignite the development and redevelopment potential of the corridor. Part two outlines specific requirements needed to fulfill this goal. It assigns general land use concepts related to long-term economic viability, transportation management, the urban design aesthetic, and public experience of the corridor.

The study process has resulted in a plan that will fundamentally change the corridor from a traffic-dominant highway to a mixed use urban center, a very dramatic and forward-thinking idea. It also strongly advocates the need for a comprehensive master plan in addition to this study, which will address issues of public and private realm interactions, long-term values, and economic sustainability. This corridor study is an important chapter of that future master plan for the City of Troy.

References

Parkways in the United States
Streets in Michigan
Metro Detroit